The Banqiao Stadium is a multi-purpose stadium in Banqiao District, New Taipei, Taiwan. It is administered by the New Taipei City Government. It consists of several parts, of which the Banqiao First Stadium (Traditional Chinese: 板橋第一運動場) is able to hold 30,000 people and was opened in 1987. It is currently used mostly for football matches. In recent years, it has also been used for outdoor concerts. Guns N' Roses kicked off their 2009-2011 World Tour at the stadium on 11 December 2009.

Transportation
The stadium is accessible within walking distance South East from Banqiao Station.

See also
 List of stadiums in Taiwan

References

1987 establishments in Taiwan
Buildings and structures in New Taipei
Football venues in Taiwan
Multi-purpose stadiums in Taiwan
Sport in New Taipei
Tourist attractions in New Taipei
Banqiao District